The Zwischbergen Pass (el. 3268 m.) is a high mountain pass across the eastern Pennine Alps, connecting Saas Almagell and Zwischbergen in the canton of Valais in Switzerland.

The pass lies between the Weissmies on the north and Portjengrat on the South.

See also
 List of mountain passes in Switzerland

External links 
 Information on itinerary (German)

Mountain passes of Valais
Mountain passes of the Alps